Gas Malaysia Berhad (doing business as Gas Malaysia) is a natural gas distribution company in Malaysia.  The company headquarters is located in Shah Alam. It has three regional offices, located in Prai, Gebeng and Pasir Gudang, and seven branch offices located throughout Peninsular Malaysia.

History
Gas Malaysia Berhad was established on 16 May 1992 to sell, market and distribute natural gas as well as to develop, operate and maintain the Natural Gas Distribution System (“NGDS”) network within Peninsular Malaysia. In December 2000, Gas Malaysia expanded its business to include the reticulated liquefied petroleum gas.

Operations
As of July 2005, the company had 452 industrial customers, more than 600 commercial customers and over 3,000 residential customers.

, Gas Malaysia had 33,707 residential and commercial customers as well as 691 industrial customers. In 2010, total gas sold by Gas Malaysia was 117.8 million British thermal units throughout Peninsular Malaysia.

Shareholders
55% of the company shares is held by MMC-Shapadu Holdings, 25% by Tokyo Gas - Mitsui Holdings and 20% by Petronas Gas Berhad.

See also
Peninsula Gas Utilisation

References

External links
 Gas Malaysia Berhad Official Website

1992 establishments in Malaysia
Oil and gas companies of Malaysia
Companies listed on Bursa Malaysia